DLF Horizon Center at Golf Course Road, Sector 43, Gurgaon, India, is a 25 storied high-rise commercial building. Designed by renowned architect Robert A.M. Stern Architects, the project is developed by Indian real estate giant DLF. The building is LEED Platinum rated for its eco-friendly design.

Offices
It houses the head office of Vistara, the Tata-Singapore Airlines joint venture airline company. Apart from Vistara, the list of tenants at One Horizon Center include Oracle, Hyatt Hotels, GlaxoSmithKline, Apple Inc., American Express, Coca-Cola, British Council, CorporatEdge among others.

Towers

One Horizon Center 
One Horizon Center is a modern architectural building located in the center of Gurugram. The building has 25 stories and 0.9 Mn Sq Ft space. This center provides commercial space for multiple multinational companies and modern businesses. It locates across the Arnold Palmer-designed DLF Golf & Country Club, one of the last remaining commercial tracts on Golf-Course Road. One Horizon Center is surrounded by shopping malls, stylish restaurants, and luxury hotels

Two Horizon Center 
Two Horizon Center is a crescent-shaped tower with a curved glass facade. It spreads over 1.17 Mn Sq Ft and is a LEED certified commercial building on the main Golf Course Road, Gurgaon. The top of the building consists of a helipad. This tower incorporates 5-star hotels and offices of Fortune 500 companies.

Horizon Plaza 
Horizon Plaza offers various culinary and leisure spaces. It is surrounded by trees, garden cafes, well-approached sit-out areas, and seating arrangements. There are terrace gardens at multiple levels of the complex that link the buildings with the green hub at its center.

How to reach 
DLF Horizon Center is located at a 35-minute drive from Indira Gandhi international airport, Delhi. It takes an 8-minute drive from Sikanderpur rapid metro station and a 10-minute drive from Huda city center metro station. The nearest bus stop is the Genpact bus stop, from where it's just a 5 minutes walk.

Specifications
 DLF's private fire station within DLF 5
 Designed to conform to seismic zone V
 Incorporates a Rooftop helipad
 Floorplates designed to maximize daylight penetration

Awards and recognitions
 Awarded 'The commercial building project of the year' in 2018
 Awarded 'Best Commercial High-rise in India' at the 'Asia Pacific International Property Awards' 2013-14
 Certified with LEED Platinum standards for very high environment friendly aspect in its design

References

Commercial buildings in India
Buildings and structures in Gurgaon